First Steps may refer to:

 First Steps (1890), a painting by Vincent van Gogh
 First Steps (painting) (1893), a painting by Georgios Jakobides
 First Steps (1947 film), a documentary film
 First Steps (1985 film), a television movie 
 "First Steps", a song by Mike Oldfield on the 2005 album Light + Shade
 "First Steps" (song), a song by Elbow, BBC theme song for the 2012 Olympics

See also
 First Step (disambiguation)